Full Basket Belize (FBB) (formerly known as International Friends of Belize (IFOB)) is a US-registered, 501(c)(3) tax-exempt non-profit organization that supports two programs: scholarships and community-based development projects in Belize.  These programs are funded entirely through donations to Full Basket Belize.  Since Full Basket Belize is completely run by volunteers, fully 100 cents of every dollar received directly support FBB projects in the communities of Belize.  

Donations may be made at the Full Basket Belize website, or by mailing a check to Full Basket Belize, 6016 NE Birch St, Hillsboro OR 97124 USA.

Programs

FBB Scholars Program
While a secondary school (high school) education is increasingly necessary to enter and compete in the Belizean job market, many Belizean families are forced to choose which of their children, if any, they can afford to enroll in secondary school.  Secondary school fees and related costs are relatively high in Belize (between US$750-1500 per year), and for many Belizeans secondary school is simply not affordable.  Approximately one-third of Belizean children do not make it past primary (elementary) school.

The FBB Scholars Program offers deserving students the opportunity to escape the cycle of poverty that plagues a large segment of Belizean society by providing the means for Belizean children to attend secondary school.

The FBB Scholars Program was established in 2005, with the aim to providing secondary school scholarships to needy and deserving students in Belize.  As of the academic year 2022-23, 415 scholarships that pay for their tuition, fees, books, and uniforms have been awarded.

The FBB Scholars program is implemented on a school-by-school basis, with memoranda of understanding (MOU) signed between interested school administrators—typically by the school principals — and FBB.  Using this model, FBB has signed MOU with secondary schools in all six Belizean districts.  FBB annually solicits accredited secondary schools to participate in the scholarship program.  For more information on how to participate in the FBB Scholars Program, please visit https://www.fullbasketbelize.org/scholars-program/].

FBB Community Grant Program
Full Basket Belize established a Community Grant Program in 2006 to provide small grants to community-based development projects in Belize in the areas of education, environment, health, youth and community economic development.  Typically, seven grants of up to US$1,000 each are awarded yearly.  More than 77 projects have been funded as of January 2022.  For further information on the FBB community grant program, please visit https://www.fullbasketbelize.org/community-grants.

History
International Friends of Belize (IFOB) was started in the spring of 2004 by a group of returned Peace Corps volunteers who had all served in Belize.  Founding members included:  Jeffrey Cleveland, Kristi Drexler, Robin Mardeusz, Maya Ravindranath, Sarah Reynolds, Sandy Roter, Donna Statler, Maura Varley, and Brenda (Link) Williams.  By April 2004, the initial steering committee was formed, bylaws were written, 501(c)(3) applications and paperwork were submitted, and two small seed grants were secured — one from the National Peace Corps Association (NPCA), with which the organization is affiliated; and the other from Johns Hopkins University.  In 2012, the organization changed its name to Full Basket Belize (FBB).

Since inception in 2004, the organization has grown significantly in both world-wide support and contributions.  In 2005 the first scholarship program was created in Stann Creek District.  In 2006 IFOB's Community Grants Program was established.  By the fall of 2023, 415 Belizean students had received scholarships to attend secondary school, and more than 77 community organizations had received grants in the areas of health, education,  environment, youth and community economic development.  

Every two years Full Basket Belize elects a Board of Directors.  Day-to-day operations are handled by board members and a small group of volunteers.  The organization's mission is to improve the education, health, and environment of Belizean communities and support youth and community economic development through scholarships and community grants.

References

External links
Full Basket Belize's website
FBB Scholarship Program
FBB Community Grant Program
National Peace Corps Association

Peace Corps website

Foreign charities operating in Belize
Peace Corps
Scholarships
Belize–United States relations